Shadi Abu Hash'hash (born 20 January 1981), is a retired Jordanian footballer and football manager.

International goals

Honours
	Shabab Al-Ordon
 Jordanian Pro League (1): 2005–06
 Jordan FA Cup (2): 2005–06, 2006–07
 Jordan Shield Cup (1): 2007
 Jordan Super Cup (1): 2007
 AFC Cup (1): 2007

Al-Fateh
 Saudi Professional League (1): 2012–13

References
 Al-Fateh (KSA) Officially Includes Jordanian Abu Hash'hash From Al-Taawon FC 
 Abu Hash'hash Returns to Al-Taawon FC (KSA) for Two Seasons

External links
 
 
 
 

1981 births
Living people
Association football midfielders
Jordanian footballers
Jordan international footballers
Shabab Al-Ordon Club players
Jordanian Pro League players
Jordanian expatriate footballers
2011 AFC Asian Cup players
Al-Fateh SC players
Al-Taawoun FC players
Expatriate footballers in Saudi Arabia
Sportspeople from Amman
Saudi Professional League players
Jordanian expatriate sportspeople in Saudi Arabia
Jordanian football managers
Jordanian expatriate football managers